The Rugby Football League Women's Super League South (known as the Betfred Women's Super League South due to sponsorship) is one of two top-level club competitions in women's rugby league in southern England and South Wales. It was originally intended to start in 2020, but was delayed due to the coronavirus pandemic. The inaugural season started in mid-June 2021 and ended on 29 August.

History

On 30 April 2021, the Rugby Football League (RFL) announced the establishment of a new "Super League South" competition, which runs in parallel to the existing Women's Super League competition in the north of England, rather than directly expand it and is the top level of club competition in southern England and South Wales. The inaugural Super League south season started in June 2021, competed for by six teams, divided into two conferences of three teams each.

On 31 July 2023, the RFL announced a new pyramid for the women's game, and in doing so confirmed that the 2023 season would be the Super League South's last. The competition would be replaced by the Regional League South and become a second tier competition with opportunity for promotion to the RFL Women's Super League. Regional League South would run parallel with a North, Roses, and Midlands league.

Clubs

Italics indicates no longer in competition.

Structure
For the inaugural season in 2021, the three teams in each conference played each other twice home and away, for a total of six games each. At the conclusion of these matches, the semi finals saw the winner of each conference playing the runner-up of the other. The winners of those two games thus played in the Grand Final, with the Cardiff Demons winning 30–26 over the British Army Rugby League side.

A League Leaders Shield was not awarded, and players in the competition were not eligible for the Woman of Steel award.
Starting from the 2022 edition of the tournament, clubs are eligible to play in the Women's Challenge Cup under the same eligibility requirements as clubs from the existing Women's Championship and League 1 competitions.

Champions

Sponsorship
Bookmakers Betfred were announced in 2021 as being the inaugural sponsors of this new competition, as well as continuing their sponsorship of Women's Super League beyond 2021.

See also

NRL Women's Premiership
NZRL Women's National Tournament

References

External links

 
Super League
Women's
Women's rugby league competitions in England
2017 establishments in England
Sports leagues established in 2017
Rugby league
Professional sports leagues in the United Kingdom